Chemicals is an extended play by the band Love and Death and was released on April 24, 2012.

History
The band's debut single, "Chemicals", was released in early May, while their debut EP of the same name released on April 24, 2012. Welch revealed that they would be releasing a cover of the song "Whip It" by Devo and a remix of "Paralyzed" by Har Meggido. The music video for "Chemicals" premiered on May 7, 2012.

Track list

Personnel

 Love and Death
 Brian 'Head' Welch – vocals, guitars
 JR Bareis - guitars
 Michael Valentine - bass guitar, guitars
 Dan Johnson - drums
 Additional musicians
 Matt Baird - vocals on "Whip It"
 Joe Rickard - additional drums on "Paralyzed"
 Jasen Rauch - synthesizer, programming, additional guitars

 Production personnel
 Jasen Rauch - producing, engineering
 Thigpen - editing, additional engineering
 David Wayne Williams - executive production
 Lee Bridges - mixing on "Paralyzed", "Whip It"
 Jim Monti - mixing on "Chemicals"
 Dan Shike - mastering

References

2012 EPs
Alternative metal EPs
Love and Death (band) albums